Boršt is a settlement in the City Municipality of Koper in the Littoral region of Slovenia.

The local church is dedicated to Saint Roch.

References

External links

Boršt on Geopedia

Populated places in the City Municipality of Koper